Tridrepana olivacea is a moth in the family Drepanidae. It was described by Warren in 1922. It is found in New Guinea, extending to Goodenough Island and the Bismarck Archipelago.

The wingspan is about 34–41 mm for males and about 44.5 mm for females.

Subspecies
Tridrepana olivacea olivacea
Tridrepana olivacea crocata Watson, 1957 (Rook Island and New Britain)

References

Moths described in 1922
Drepaninae